

Series overview

Episodes

Season 1 (1999–2000)

 Robert Palm leaves the show as executive producer.
 Michelle Hurd (Monique Jefferies) appears as a recurring character in episodes 1–13. She is then added to the main cast starting with the 14th episode.

Season 2 (2000–01)

 Stephanie March (Alexandra Cabot) and Ice-T (Fin Tutuola) join the cast.
 Michelle Hurd (Monique Jeffries) leaves the cast after the episode "Runaway".
 Neal Baer begins taking over as executive producer.

Season 3 (2001–02)

Season 4 (2002–03)

BD Wong (George Huang) officially joins the cast.

Season 5 (2003–04)

Stephanie March (ADA Alexandra Cabot) leaves the cast after the episode "Loss". Her character is "killed off" and put into the Witness Protection Program. March (Cabot) is replaced by Diane Neal as ADA Casey Novak in the episode "Serendipity".

Season 6 (2004–05)

Stephanie March returns to reprise her role as ADA Alexandra Cabot for one episode ("Ghost"). Her character was a regular on SVU for seasons 2–5.

Season 7 (2005–06)

Tamara Tunie (M.E. Melinda Warner) officially joins the cast.

Season 8 (2006–07)

Connie Nielsen had a six episode arc as Det. Dani Beck from the episode "Clock" to the episode "Cage", not appearing in "Infiltrated".

Season 9 (2007–08)

Adam Beach (Det. Chester Lake) joins the cast, then leaves with Diane Neal (ADA Casey Novak) at the end.

Season 10 (2008–09)

 Michaela McManus (ADA Kim Greylek) joins the cast after replacing Diane Neal (ADA Casey Novak) through the fifteenth episode, "Lead", where she is replaced by Stephanie March (ADA Alexandra Cabot) in a recurring capacity.

Season 11 (2009–2010)

 Christine Lahti had a four-episode arc as Executive ADA Sonya Paxton; from the season premiere episode "Unstable" to "Hammered". She also returns in the eighth episode, "Turmoil".
 Stephanie March rejoined the cast as ADA Alexandra Cabot starting with the episode "Hardwired" to the episode "Witness".
 Sharon Stone had a four-episode arc as ADA Jo Marlowe from the episode "Torch" to the season finale episode "Shattered".

Season 12 (2010–11)

 Melissa Sagemiller has a continuous episode arc as ADA Gillian Hardwicke starting with the episode "Branded" to the episode "Bombshell".
Diane Neal returns to reprise her role as ADA Casey Novak for one episode ("Reparations"). Her character was a regular on SVU from seasons 5–9.
Neal Baer leaves the show as executive producer at the end of the season.
 Christopher Meloni (Det. Elliot Stabler), BD Wong (George Huang), and Tamara Tunie (Melinda Warner) leave the cast after the season finale ("Smoked").

Season 13 (2011–12)

 Warren Leight begins taking over as executive producer.
 Danny Pino (Det. Nick Amaro) and Kelli Giddish (Det. Amanda Rollins) join the cast.
 Stephanie March (ADA Alexandra Cabot) and Diane Neal (ADA Casey Novak) both return as recurring characters.
 Tamara Tunie (M.E. Melinda Warner) is moved from the main cast to a recurring role.
 BD Wong (Dr. George Huang) reprises his role in "Father Dearest" following his departure from the cast in July 2011.

Season 14 (2012–13)

 Raúl Esparza has a continuous arc as ADA Rafael Barba starting with the third episode.

Season 15 (2013–14)

 Raúl Esparza (ADA Rafael Barba) is promoted to the main cast.
 Richard Belzer (Sergeant John Munch) departs the main cast after the fifth episode.
 Dann Florek (Captain Don Cragen) departs the main cast after the eleventh episode.

Season 16 (2014–15)

 Peter Scanavino joins as a recurring guest for the first three episodes, portraying Det. Dominick "Sonny" Carisi, Jr. He is promoted to the main cast in the fifth episode.
 Danny Pino (Det. Nick Amaro) departs the cast after the season finale ("Surrendering Noah").

Season 17 (2015–16)

 Andy Karl has a continuous arc as Sergeant Mike Dodds starting with "Maternal Instincts" to "Heartfelt Passages".
 BD Wong reprised his role as Dr. George Huang in the episode "Depravity Standard". This was his fourth appearance on the show since his departure at the end of season 12.
 Warren Leight leaves the show as executive producer at the end of the season.

Season 18 (2016–17)

 Rick Eid takes over as executive producer. In May 2017, it was announced that he would depart the series as executive producer at the end of this season.

Season 19 (2017–18)

 Michael S. Chernuchin takes over as executive producer.
 Philip Winchester joins the cast in the thirteenth episode as Peter Stone following the cancellation of Chicago Justice.
 Raúl Esparza departs the cast in the 13th episode, "The Undiscovered Country".

Seasons 20–present (2018–present)

Home video releases

References

External links
Episodes at the official site of Law & Order: Special Victims Unit
The NBC Law & Order SVU Production Blog
Episodes at The Futon Critic
Episodes on TVGuide.com
Law & Order: Special Victims Unit DVD releases at TVShowsOnDVD.com

 
Lists of American crime drama television series episodes
Law & Order: Special Victims Unit seasons